Annihilation is a 2018 science fiction psychological horror film written and directed by Alex Garland, based on the 2014 novel of the same name by Jeff VanderMeer. It stars Natalie Portman, Jennifer Jason Leigh, Gina Rodriguez, Tessa Thompson, Tuva Novotny, and Oscar Isaac. The story follows a group of explorers who enter "The Shimmer", a mysterious quarantined zone of mutating plants and animals caused by an alien presence.

Annihilation was released theatrically in the United States by Paramount Pictures on February 23, 2018, and in China on April 13, 2018. It was released digitally by Netflix in a number of other countries on March 12, 2018. It received positive reviews from critics and audience. It grossed $43 million worldwide. According to Empire magazine, the film addresses "depression, grief, and the human propensity for self-destruction".

Plot
Lena, a biology professor and army veteran, loses her husband, Kane, after he is deployed on a special forces mission. She believes Kane accepted a suicide mission because she cheated on him.

Kane suddenly reappears at home, then starts convulsing. Lena calls an ambulance but government forces divert it to a secret facility. A psychologist named Dr. Ventress tells her a mysterious zone called the "Shimmer" has been expanding from a fallen meteor for three years. Kane's team explored the Shimmer, but only he returned, and he is now comatose. Lena volunteers to join a new expedition to the lighthouse where the meteor landed, hoping to find a remedy for Kane's condition. Ventress also recruits the physicist Josie Radek, the geomorphologist Cassie "Cass" Sheppard, and the paramedic Anya Thorensen.

After entering the Shimmer, the group wakes up and realizes they have already travelled several days but have no memory of the journey. All wildlife in the Shimmer has mutated. An alligator with several concentric rows of teeth attacks Josie but the group saves her.

The group reaches a military base. They find a video of Kane cutting open a soldier to reveal moving intestines, and later find the soldier’s corpse transformed by alien growths resembling fungi. At night, a mutant bear attacks the camp and kills Cass.

The survivors discover plants shaped like humans, leading Josie to theorize the Shimmer distorts information like a prism refracts light, intermixing the wildlife's DNA. Anya realizes they are also mutating and ties up the others in a panic. Anya then hears Cass's voice and runs to it, only to be mauled to death by the mutant bear, which used Cass’s dying screams as a lure. Josie frees herself and shoots the bear. Ventress (who has cancer, unbeknownst to the group) leaves hurriedly for the lighthouse so she can study it before she dies or mutates. Josie realizes the Shimmer mixed pieces of the dying Cass into the bear, and willfully mutates into a plant to avoid a similar fate.

Lena arrives at the lighthouse and discovers a video camera next to a burnt corpse. The footage shows Kane telling the cameraperson to find Lena, then killing himself with a phosphorus grenade. The footage then shows that the cameraman is a doppelgänger of Kane. Lena descends into the meteor crater and finds Ventress, who explains the Shimmer will eventually swallow everything. She disintegrates into a pulsing Mandelbulb that absorbs blood from Lena, creating a humanoid that mimics Lena’s motions. Unable to escape the creature, Lena tricks it into accepting a phosphorus grenade as it transforms into her doppelgänger. Lena flees, but her doppelgänger calmly allows the grenade to burn it along with the lighthouse. The Shimmer collapses.

Back at the facility, Lena tells an interrogator that the Shimmer did not seek to destroy, but to "make something new.” She asks Kane, who is now awake, if he is really Kane; he replies, "I don't think so.” He asks if she is really Lena, but she does not answer. They embrace and their irises shimmer.

Cast

 Natalie Portman as Lena
 Jennifer Jason Leigh as Dr. Ventress
 Gina Rodriguez as Anya Thorensen
 Tessa Thompson as Josie Radek
 Tuva Novotny as Cassie “Cass” Sheppard
 Oscar Isaac as Kane
 Benedict Wong as Lomax
 Sonoya Mizuno as Katie
Also plays a motion captured role as the Humanoid
 David Gyasi as Daniel
 Sammy Hayman as Mayer
 Josh Danford as Shelley

Production

Development 
Paramount Pictures and Scott Rudin acquired the film rights to Annihilation, the then-unpublished first novel in Jeff VanderMeer's Southern Reach Trilogy, on March 26, 2013. Rudin and Eli Bush were set to produce the film, and Alex Garland, who had previously worked with Rudin and Bush on Ex Machina, was hired to write and direct the film in October 2014.

Garland explained that his adaptation was necessarily based on only the first novel in the trilogy: "At the point I started working on Annihilation, there was only one of the three books. I knew that it was planned as a trilogy by the author, but there was only the manuscript for the first book. I really didn't think too much about the trilogy side of it."

Garland said his adaptation is "a memory of the book", rather than book-referenced screenwriting, with the intention of capturing the "dreamlike nature" and tone of his experience reading VanderMeer's novel. Rather than trying to directly adapt the book, Garland deliberately took the story in his own direction, with VanderMeer's permission. Garland did not read the other two books when they arrived, as he was concerned he would need to revise his script. Others informed him of the elements of the books, and he expressed surprise at some of the similarities.

Some critics have noted the film has similarities with the science-fiction novel Roadside Picnic and its 1979 movie adaptation, Stalker.  While Nerdist Industries' Kyle Anderson noted even stronger resemblance with the 1927 short story "The Colour Out of Space" by H. P. Lovecraft (also adapted for the screen on several occasions, including as Color Out of Space in 2019), about a meteorite that lands in a swamp and unleashes a mutagenic plague, Chris McCoy of the Memphis Flyer found the film (Annihilation) reminiscent both of "The Colour Out of Space", as well as the novel (Roadside Picnic) and its film adaptation (Stalker). VanderMeer stated that the original novel "is 100% NOT a tribute to Picnic/Stalker", but rather drew influences from works by J.G. Ballard and Franz Kafka.

Casting 
The first cast member to join Annihilation was Natalie Portman, who entered negotiations with the studio in May 2015, under the agreement that production not begin until 2016. Once Portman had agreed to play the biologist, the next cast member added was Gina Rodriguez, who entered talks with Paramount in November 2015. By that point, production was set to begin in early 2016, a decision made to accommodate Portman's schedule but which also fell during Rodriguez's break from filming Jane the Virgin. Oscar Isaac joined the cast in March 2016 as the husband of Portman's character; he had previously worked with Garland in Ex Machina. By the end of April, Tessa Thompson, Jennifer Jason Leigh, and David Gyasi were also attached to the project.

In 2018, Garland was criticized by the Media Action Network for Asian Americans and the American Indians in Film and Television advocacy groups for whitewashing the roles played by Portman and Leigh. In the Southern Reach novels, the Biologist is described as being of Asian descent, while the Psychologist is mixed-race and half-Indigenous;  Portman and Leigh are both Jewish. Garland responded to the accusations by saying that there was "nothing cynical or conspiratorial" about the casting, and that the book in which the characters' races are revealed, Authority, had not been released by the time Annihilation had been written and cast. Portman also responded to the controversy, saying that she did not know her character had a specific ethnicity until whitewashing concerns were raised, and that Garland had intentionally not spoken to VanderMeer about the other two Southern Reach novels because he wanted to focus on adapting Annihilation.

Filming
Principal photography was underway by April 2016, when actor David Gyasi was added to the cast. Lighthouse Pictures Ltd started location filming in late April in South Forest, Windsor Great Park. Some test shooting had already been done in St. Marks, Florida, but the vegetation in the area turned out to be too dense to give any depth perception on screen. On May 9, 2016, cinematographer Rob Hardy began sharing pictures from the set of the film. On July 13 and 14, filming took place at Holkham Pines in North Norfolk. Shooting was completed that month.

The visual effect team was made up of many of Garland's collaborators from his previous film, Ex Machina, including VFX Supervisor Andrew Whitehurst, lead VFX house Double Negative and Milk VFX, plus special makeup effects by Tristan Versluis.

Release
Due to a poorly received test screening, David Ellison, a financier and producer at Skydance, became concerned that the film was "too intellectual" and "too complicated", and demanded changes to make it appeal to a wider audience, including making Portman's character more sympathetic, and changing the ending. Producer Scott Rudin sided with the director, who did not want to alter the film. Rudin, who had final cut privilege, defended the film and refused to take notes from Ellison.

On December 7, 2017, it was announced that due to the clashes between Rudin and Ellison, and the shift in Paramount's leadership, a deal was struck allowing Netflix to distribute the film internationally. According to this deal, Paramount would handle the American, Canadian and Chinese release, while Netflix would begin streaming the film in other territories 17 days later.

The film was released theatrically in the United States on February 23, 2018, by Paramount Pictures, and digitally in other markets on March 12, 2018, by Netflix. Garland expressed his disappointment with the decision to coincide digital distribution with theatrical, saying, "We made the film for cinema." On January 5, 2019, the film was released digitally on Netflix's competitor Hulu.

Annihilation was released on Digital HD on May 22, 2018, and on Ultra HD Blu-ray, Blu-ray and DVD on May 29, 2018.

Reception

Box office
Annihilation grossed $32.7 million in the United States and Canada and $10.3 million in China, for a worldwide total of $43.1 million, against a production budget of $40–55 million. While the film did not amass much in terms of box office, the film found new life in home release, with some publications arguing it could become a cult classic.

Domestically, Annihilation was released alongside Game Night and Every Day, and was projected to gross $10–12 million from 2,012 theaters in its opening weekend. The film made $3.9 million on its first day (including $900,000 from Thursday night previews at 1,850 theaters). It ended up making $11 million over the weekend, finishing fourth, behind Black Panther, Game Night and Peter Rabbit. In its second weekend the film dropped 49% to $5.9 million, falling to 6th place.

Critical response
The website's critical consensus reads, "Annihilation backs up its sci-fi visual wonders and visceral genre thrills with an impressively ambitious—and surprisingly strange—exploration of challenging themes that should leave audiences pondering long after the end credits roll." On Metacritic, the film has a weighted average score of 79 out of 100, based on reviews from 51 critics, indicating "generally favorable reviews". Audiences polled by CinemaScore gave the film an average grade of "C" on an A+ to F scale, while PostTrak reported filmgoers gave it a 71% overall positive score. And on IMDb, the film has an average rating of 6.4/10, from 334000 ratings.

Richard Roeper of the Chicago Sun-Times gave the film four out of four stars, praising it for taking risks, and saying: "Kudos to Garland and the cast, but bravo to Scott Rudin as well. Apparently you knew a masterpiece when you saw it, and you made sure we were able to see it as well." Writing for Rolling Stone, Peter Travers complimented the cast and Garland's writing and direction, giving the film three and a half stars out of four and saying, "Garland need make no apologies for Annihilation. It's a bracing brainteaser with the courage of its own ambiguity. You work out the answers in your own head, in your own time, in your own dreams, where the best sci-fi puzzles leave things." The Economist described the film as "tightrope-walking the fine line between open-ended, mind-expanding mystery and lethargic, pretentious twaddle", but praised its final half hour.

References

External links 
 
 

2018 films
2018 horror films
2010s science fiction horror films
Adultery in films
Alien invasions in films
American nonlinear narrative films
American science fiction horror films
British nonlinear narrative films
British science fiction horror films
Films about scientists
Films based on American horror novels
Films based on science fiction novels
Films directed by Alex Garland
Films produced by Scott Rudin
Films shot in Berkshire
Films shot in London
Films shot in Norfolk
Films shot in Surrey
Films using motion capture
Films with screenplays by Alex Garland
Films about impact events
Paramount Pictures films
Skydance Media films
Films about extraterrestrial life
Alien visitations in films
2010s English-language films
Films shot at Pinewood Studios
2010s American films
2010s British films